Bruce Wardlaw (9 January 1914 – 12 September 1986) was an Australian cricketer. He played one first-class match for Tasmania in 1936/37.

See also
 List of Tasmanian representative cricketers

References

External links
 

1914 births
1986 deaths
Australian cricketers
Tasmania cricketers
Cricketers from Hobart